[[File:Firefly of France lobby card.jpg|right|thumb|262px|Ogle is in the center of the photo with other cast of The Firefly of France]]

Charles Stanton Ogle (June 5, 1865 – October 11, 1940) was an American stage and silent-film actor. He was the first actor to portray Frankenstein's monster in a motion picture in 1910 and played Long John Silver in Treasure Island in 1920.

Biography

Born in Steubenville, Ohio, Ogle is the son Joseph Ogle, was the son of Irish immigrants, and worked as a Methodist Minister.  His mother, Anna C. Mast, was of German descent and used to work as a gold shop seller. Ogle attended the University of Illinois College of Law and practiced law for about two years while pursuing a Bachelor of Laws degree. Ogle initially performed in live theatre, making his first appearance on Broadway in 1905. Three years later, he embarked on a film career, initially working at Edison Studios in The Bronx, New York. He performed in The Boston Tea Party, which was directed by Edwin S. Porter. He then went on to portray the monster in the first film version of Frankenstein (1910) and to star in What Happened to Mary (1912), the first serial film produced in the United States. In 1920 Ogle moved to Los Angeles to portrayed Long John Silver in Treasure Island, which also featured Lon Chaney. He went on to become a prolific character actor, making the last of his more than 300 film appearances in 1926.after Retiring from Film he Worked as a Lawyer until his death.

Ogle died in Long Beach, California of arteriosclerosis.

Selected filmography

 The Boston Tea Party (1908, Short)
 Frankenstein (1910, Short) - The Monster (uncredited)
 A Christmas Carol (1910, Short) - Bob Cratchit
 Turned to the Wall (1911, Short) - Squire Ruby
 The Battle of Trafalgar (1911) - The Ship's Surgeon
 Captain Nell (1911) short  - Mr. Randolph, Harry's Father
 The Black Arrow (1911) short  - Richard Shelton
 For the Cause of the South (1912) - Confederate Colonel Randall
 A Personal Affair (1912, Short) - The Prizefighter
 Like Knights of Old (1912, Short) - The Knight
 What Happened to Mary (1912, Short) - Richard Craig - Mary's Uncle
 The Diamond Crown (1913, Short) - Kate's Father - An Ex-Detective
 The Active Life of Dolly of the Dailies (1914) - James Malone
 The Man Who Disappeared (1914) - Miens / Biceps
 Thou Shalt Not Lie (1915, Short) - The Detective
 Under Southern Skies (1915) - Major Crofton
 The Heir to the Hoorah (1916) - Bill Ferguson
 The Years of the Locust (1916) - McKenzie, Mead's Mine Manager
 On Record (1917) - Frederick Manson
 Those Without Sin (1917) - Colonel Dackens
 The Cost of Hatred (1917) - McCabe
 A Romance of the Redwoods (1917) - Jim Lyn
 At First Sight (1917)
 Rebecca of Sunnybrook Farm (1917) - Mr. Cobb
 The Sunset Trail (1917) - Judd Aiken
 The Secret Game (1917) - Dr. Ebell Smith
 Nan of Music Mountain (1917) - Sassoon
 The Fair Barbarian (1917)
 Jules of the Strong Heart (1918) - Tom Farnsworth
 Rimrock Jones (1918) - Hassayamp Hicks
 The Thing We Love (1918) - Adolph Weimer
 Wild Youth (1918) - Doctor
 The Whispering Chorus (1918) - Judge (uncredited)
 M'Liss (1918) - Yuba Bill
 Old Wives for New (1918) - Bit Role (uncredited)
 Believe Me, Xantippe (1918) - Wrenn Wrgley
 We Can't Have Everything (1918) - Kedzie's Father
 The Firefly of France (1918) - Von Blenheim (aka Jenkins)
 Less Than Kin (1918) - Overton
 The Source (1918) - 'Sim-Sam' Samuels
 The Goat (1918) - Director Graham
 Too Many Millions (1918) - Garage Keeper
 The Squaw Man (1918) - Bull Cowan
 Under the Top (1919) - Otto B. Shott
 The Dub (1919) - George Markham
 Alias Mike Moran (1919) - Peter Young
 The Poor Boob (1919) - Tucker
 Something to Do (1919) - Professor Frank Blight
 Fires of Faith (1919) - William Booth, Found of the Salvation Army
 Men, Women, and Money (1919) - Dr. Malcolm Lloyd
 A Daughter of the Wolf (1919) - Doc
 The Heart of Youth (1919) - Os Whipple
 The Valley of the Giants (1919) - Cardigan
 Told in the Hills (1919) - Davy MacDougall
 The Lottery Man (1919)
 Hawthorne of the U.S.A. (1919) - Col. Radulski
 Everywoman (1919) - Time
 Young Mrs. Winthrop (1920) - Buxton Scott
 Jack Straw (1920) - Mr. Parker Jennings
 Treasure Island (1920) - Long John Silver
 What's Your Hurry? (1920) - Patrick MacMurran
 The Prince Chap (1920) - Runion
 Conrad in Quest of His Youth (1920) - Dobson
 Midsummer Madness (1921) - Caretaker
 The Jucklins (1921) - Lim Judklin
 Brewster's Millions (1921) - Colonel Drew
 What Every Woman Knows (1921) - Alick Wylie
 A Wise Fool (1921) - Judge Carcasson
 Gasoline Gus (1921) - Nate Newberry
 Crazy to Marry (1921) - Cement man
 The Affairs of Anatol (1921) - Dr. Bowles (uncredited)
 After the Show (1921) - Pop O'Malley
 Miss Lulu Bett (1921) - Station Agent
 A Homespun Vamp (1922) - Donald Craig
 Her Husband's Trademark (1922) - Father Berlekey
 Is Matrimony a Failure? (1922) - Pop Skinner
 North of the Rio Grande (1922) - Colonel Haddington
 The Woman Who Walked Alone (1922) - Schriemann
 Our Leading Citizen (1922) - The Judge
 If You Believe It, It's So (1922) - Colonel Williams
 Manslaughter (1922) - Doctor
 The Young Rajah (1922) - Joshua Judd
 Thirty Days (1922) - Judge Hooker
 Kick In (1922) - John Stephens
 Garrison's Finish (1923) - Colonel Desha's Trainer
 Grumpy (1923) - Ruddock
 The Covered Wagon (1923) - Jesse Wingate
 Sixty Cents an Hour (1923) - James Smith
 Hollywood (1923) - Himself (cameo)
 Salomy Jane (1923) - Madison Clay
 Ruggles of Red Gap (1923) - Jeff Tuttle
 The Ten Commandments (1923) - The Doctor
 Flaming Barriers (1924) - Patrick Malone
 Secrets (1924) - Dr. McGovern
 Triumph (1924) - James Martin
 Code of the Sea (1924) - Superintendent Beasley
 The Bedroom Window (1924) - Butler
 The Border Legion (1924) - Harvey Roberts
 Merton of the Movies (1924) - Mr. Montague
 The Alaskan (1924) - Lawyer
 The Garden of Weeds (1924) - Henry Poulson
 Code of the West (1925) - Henry Thurman
 The Golden Bed (1925) - Minor Role (uncredited)
 Contraband (1925) - Sheriff Churchill
 The Thundering Herd (1925) - Clark Hudnall
 One Minute to Play (1926) - John Wade
 The Flaming Forest'' (1926) - Donald McTavish (final film role)

References

External links

 

1865 births
1940 deaths
American male stage actors
American male film actors
American male silent film actors
People from Steubenville, Ohio
20th-century American male actors
Burials at Forest Lawn Memorial Park (Glendale)